Arvid Järnefelt (16 November 1861, in , Russian Empire – 27 December 1932, in Helsinki, Finland) was a Finnish judge and writer.

Arvid's parents were  general and  governor  August Aleksander Järnefelt and Elisabeth Järnefelt (née Clodt von Jürgensburg).
Arvid had nine siblings: Kasper, Erik, Ellida, Ellen, Armas, Aino, Hilja and Sigrid. 

Arvid Järnefelt married Emilia Fredrika Parviainen at Jyväskylä on 6 September 1884. They had five children: Eero, Liisa, Anna, Maija, and Emmi. Eero became later  diplomat and Ambassador.

Järnefelt became a famous author in the late 19th century. He wrote realistic, often tendentious but psychologically insightful novels, short stories and memoirs.

Järnefelt was among the founders of the cultural magazine Valvoja which was launched in 1880. In 1889 Arvid founded the newspaper Päivälehti with his friends Eero Erkko and Juhani Aho. Päivälehti was succeeded by Helsingin Sanomat in 1904.

Arvid Järnefelt became interested in Tolstoyanism, influenced by his mother Elisabeth.
He had studied law and 1891 became a trainee lawyer in Vaasa. At the time, he read the writings of Russian author Leo Tolstoy and became a fan of Tolstoyanism. Arvid quit his career as a lawyer and began to live as a Tolstoyan; he became a farmer at Virkkala. He also helped the poor and prisoners.

One of his plays, Kuolema (Death) (1903, revised 1911), had incidental music composed by his brother-in-law Jean Sibelius, which includes the famous Valse triste.

References

External links
 
 

1861 births
1932 deaths
Writers from Saint Petersburg
People from Sankt-Peterburgsky Uyezd
Finnish people of German descent
19th-century Finnish nobility
20th-century Finnish judges
Finnish biographers
Tolstoyans
20th-century biographers
Finnish magazine founders